is a passenger railway station located in the city of Himeji, Hyōgo Prefecture, Japan, operated by the private Sanyo Electric Railway.

Lines

Station layout
The station consists of two unnumbered ground-level side platforms connected by an underground passage. The station building is located at the north east end of the Shikama bound platform.  Part of the underpass is divided outside of the fare controlled area to allow access to the station from the south side. The station is unattended.

Platforms

Adjacent stations

|-
!colspan=5|Sanyo Electric Railway

History
Yumesakigawa Station opened on October 15, 1940.

Passenger statistics
In fiscal 2018, the station was used by an average of 1190 passengers daily (boarding passengers only).

Surrounding area
Yumesaki River
Nippon Steel Setouchi Steel Works

See also
List of railway stations in Japan

References

External links

  Official website (Sanyo Electric Railway) 

Railway stations in Japan opened in 1940
Railway stations in Himeji